Sir Robert Howard (January 1626 – 3 September 1698) was an English playwright and politician. He fought for the Royalist cause in the English Civil War.

Life
He was born the 6th son of Thomas Howard, 1st Earl of Berkshire and his wife Elizabeth. As the 18-year-old son of a Royalist family, he fought at the battle of Cropredy Bridge and was knighted for the bravery he showed there. In the years after the English Civil War his royalist sympathies led to his imprisonment at Windsor Castle in 1658.

After the Restoration, he quickly rose to prominence in political life, with several appointments to posts which brought him influence and money. He was Member of Parliament for Stockbridge in the Cavalier Parliament (1661 to 1679) and for Castle Rising (1679 to 1681 and 1689 to 1698), and believed in a balance of parliament and monarchy. All his life he continued in a series of powerful positions; in 1671 he became secretary to the Treasury, and in 1673 auditor of the Exchequer. He helped bring William of Orange to the throne and was made a privy councillor in 1689. His interest in financial matters continued, and in later life he subscribed to the newly founded Bank of England while continuing his work on currency reform.

Robert Howard is the first person known to use the English phase "We the People." He used this phrase in a debate in Parliament on 28 January 1689. He said, referring to King James II:

He was thought of as arrogant and was caricatured in a play by Shadwell as Sir Positive-At-All, a boastful knight. Howard died on 3 September 1698 and is buried in Westminster Abbey.

Works

Most of his writing was for the stage, although he also wrote some poetry, and two books on political questions. One of these was The Life and Reign of King Richard the Second, published anonymously in 1681, with the author described simply as 'a Person of Quality'. The book was published in octavo and contains 240 pages. In his Preface, Howard states that he 'has made it his business truly to set down naked matters of fact as he finds them related by the best authors, without obtruding his own fancies or dreams under the notion of history'. Howard was active in the London theatrical world after the Restoration, and was both scene designer for, and shareholder in, the Theatre Royal, along with Thomas Killigrew and eight actors. His plays were successful and continued to be performed in the 18th century, though some later critics, notably Walter Scott, found fault with them. The Committee; Or, The Faithful Irishman (1665), a political comedy, was the most popular. It caricatured the manners of the Commonwealth. 

The Great Favourite, or The Duke of Lerma was preferred by some writers: A. W. Ward, for example. Howard and his brother-in-law, the poet John Dryden, co-wrote The Indian Queen, later set to music by Henry Purcell. Howard, who had acted as Dryden's patron for some time, went on to have a public dispute with him over the use of rhyme in drama, but they were reconciled before Howard's death.

Other poets' work paid tribute to Howard. John Dryden wrote a poem entitled, "To Sir My Honored Friend, Sir Robert Howard", in which Dryden praised Howard for his poetic abilities.

Family

He married four times.
After the mother of his six children, Anne Kingsmill, died, he married an older widow, Lady Honoria (née O'Brien), and adopted the manor at Wootton Bassett left her by her husband, Sir Francis Englefield. Lady Honoria complained to the King and to the Commons that Howard did not allow her any of the money which she had brought into the marriage. His third wife was Mary Uphill, who was often at Howard's manor house at Ashtead which he bought around 1680. In 1693 he married an 18-year-old maid of honour, Anabella Dives.

Thomas was his only surviving son; his daughter, the Poor Clare Mary Howard was in a convent at Rouen.

Howard was a great-grandson of Henry Howard, Earl of Surrey, who, jointly with his friend Sir Thomas Wyatt were known as the "Fathers of the English Sonnet" and were the first English poets to write in the sonnet form that Shakespeare later used. He had three brothers who also wrote plays — Edward Howard, Colonel Henry Howard, and James Howard. Their sister, Elizabeth Howard, was married to the influential English poet, literary critic, translator, and playwright John Dryden.

Notes

References
 Charles Mosley (ed.), Burke's Peerage, Baronetage & Knightage, 107th Edition, Wilmington, Delaware, 2003, vol III, pp. 3814–3817, 
. 

The Cambridge History of English and American Literature
 The above painting of Robert Howard by Van Dyck is in the British collection of Christian Levett.

Further reading 
 The standard biography is H. J. Oliver's Sir Robert Howard, 1626–1698: a Critical Biography (Durham: Duke University Press, 1963).
 Sir Robert Howard in Lives of the Poets by Theophilus Cibber
 The Indian Queen
 Samuel Pepys' diary entry on The Committee
 Dryden's To My Honored Friend Sir Robert Howard
 Petition to the House of Commons from "Sir Robert Howard's Lady, Lady Honoria"
 

1626 births
1698 deaths
Alumni of Magdalene College, Cambridge
English dramatists and playwrights
Knights Bachelor
Knights of the Bath
Members of the Privy Council of England
Younger sons of earls
Robert Howard
Place of birth missing
Cavaliers
17th-century English writers
17th-century English male writers
English MPs 1661–1679
English MPs 1679
English MPs 1680–1681
English MPs 1685–1687
English MPs 1689–1690
English MPs 1690–1695
English MPs 1695–1698
English male dramatists and playwrights